Vladislav Bajac (born 2 June 1954)  is Serbian writer, poet, journalist and publisher.

Biography 
He was born in Belgrade in 1954 and later studied philology at the University of Belgrade. In 1993, he founded the publishing house Geopoetika, which publishes fiction as well as nonfiction books about history, art, rock & roll, and archeology. Geopoetika has published Serbian Prose in Translation, a collection of Serbian books translated into English.
His books were translated into twenty languages.
His best-known work is his 2008 novel, Hamam Balkanija, for which he won the International Literature Prize Balkanika. Its chapters alternate between two timelines, both of which use characters based on real people. The contemporary timeline is a collection of vignettes in autobiographical first person narration told from Bajac's point of view. In the original edition it was printed in the Cyrillic script, and people such as Alberto Manguel and Allen Ginsberg appear alongside the author. The earlier timeline consists of a single story set in the sixteenth century, using omniscient third person narration, featuring the Grand Vizier of the Ottoman Empire and Suleiman the Magnificent. That story was originally printed in the Latin alphabet. The book's themes, and its dual structure and narrative styles, raise questions about where identity comes from and how it is shaped by religion and national history.

In 2017, Bajac has signed the Declaration on the Common Language of the Croats, Serbs, Bosniaks and Montenegrins.

Works 
Poetry
 Which way Leads To People, 1972
 The Path of Haiku, 1988
Short Stories
 Europe On the Bull’s Back, 1988
 Dream Coasters (Geopoetical Fables), 1992
 Gastronomadic Stories, 2012
Novels
 The Book of Bamboo, 1989
 The Black Box (An Utopia On Subsequent Reality), 1993
 The Druid of Sindidun, 1998
 Escape from Biography (A Life under Eight Names), 2001
 Europe Express (A Novel In Short Stories), 2003
 Hamam Balkania (A Novel and Other Stories), 2008
 Chronicles of Doubt, 2016
English editions
 Hamam Balkania, Belgrade, Geopoetika, 2009
 Hamam Balkania, Blooming Twig Books, New York & Tulsa, 2014
 Hamam Balkania, Istros Books, London, 2014

Awards

 Dimitrije Mitrinovic Award (for the excellence in writing), Belgrade, Serbia, 2015.
 Special Book Award of China, Beijing (for the Chinese culture contribution to the world), 2014. 
 Haiku awards at The International Itoen Haiku Poetry Contest, Tokyo, Japan, in both 1991. and 1993.
 Stevan Pesic Award for the best 1995 prose book in 1996 for the revised edition
 Borislav Pekic Foundation Prize for the best manuscript in 1993'
 The 6th April Award (The Book Day) proclaimed by The Serbian Literary Union and Belgrade City Assembly as the best novel on (ancient) Belgrade in 1998.
 The Golden Best-Seller Award for the Top ten best-selling books in 1999.
 Branko Copic Foundation Award (Serbian Academy of Science and Art) for the best book in 1998.
 Proclaimed as "The Novel of the Year" (1998) by Vecernje Novosti (Evening Daily News).
 Award for one of ten best-selling books in 2001
 International Award for Collected Prose Work, Macedonia, 2003
 International Balkanika Award for the best book on the Balkans in 2007/2008, International jury
 Isidora Sekulić Award for the best book in Serbia in 2008
 Hit Liber Award for one of ten Best-selling books in 2008
 Kocicevo pero Award, Bosnia and Herzegovina, 2010
 Petar Kocic Award for the excellence in writing, Banjaluka, Bosnia and Herzegovina, 2010
 Ramonda Serbica Award for Lifetime achievement in literature and for contribution to literature and culture, Nis, Serbia, 2012
 Prozart Award for affirmation of Balkan literature, PRO-ZA Balkan Festival, Skopje, Macedonia, 2013

References 

Living people
Serbian novelists
Serbian male short story writers
Serbian short story writers
Serbian publishers (people)
Signatories of the Declaration on the Common Language
Year of birth missing (living people)